Arthur Laverne Peterson (born June 27, 1926) is an American educator and politician.

Peterson was born in Glyndon, Minnesota. He served in the United States Marine Corps during the Korean War. In 1947, he graduated from Yale University. He then received his master's degree from the University of Southern California in 1949. In 1962, he received his doctorate in philosophy from the University of Minnesota. He lived in Prescott, Wisconsin and worked for Eaton Plumbing and Heating. From 1951 to 1955, Peterson served in the Wisconsin Assembly and was a Republican. He taught political science at University of Wisconsin–Eau Claire and Ohio Wesleyan University. In 1966, Peterson accepted the position of President at Thunderbird School of Global Management, then known as the American Institute for Foreign Trade. During his time at Thunderbird, Peterson would land his own personal plane at the campus which once a WWII-era airfield. By the time of his departure to Pepperdine University in 1969, Peterson had helped Thunderbird achieve accreditation through the North Central Association of Colleges and Schools. In 1989, Peterson taught political science at Rocky Mountain College in Billings, Montana. He served in the Montana House of Representatives from 2000 to 2002 as a Republican. Peterson lives in Billings, Montana.

Peterson was a candidate for California’s 39th district, but he lost the primary.

Notable works 
Peterson, Arthur L. "McCarthyism: Its Ideology and Foundations." PhD Diss., University of Minnesota, 1962.

Notes

1926 births
Living people
People from Clay County, Minnesota
People from Prescott, Wisconsin
Politicians from Billings, Montana
Military personnel from Minnesota
Military personnel from Wisconsin
Yale University alumni
University of Minnesota alumni
University of Southern California alumni
University of Wisconsin–Eau Claire faculty
Ohio Wesleyan University faculty
Rocky Mountain College faculty
Republican Party members of the Montana House of Representatives
Republican Party members of the Wisconsin State Assembly
Candidates in the 2022 United States House of Representatives elections